In algebraic geometry, the Segre cubic is a cubic threefold embedded in 4 (or sometimes 5) dimensional projective space, studied by .

Definition
The Segre cubic is the set of points (x0:x1:x2:x3:x4:x5) of P5 satisfying the equations

Properties
The intersection of the Segre cubic with any hyperplane xi = 0 is the Clebsch cubic surface. Its intersection with any hyperplane xi = xj is Cayley's nodal cubic surface. Its dual is the Igusa quartic 3-fold in P4. Its Hessian is the Barth–Nieto quintic.
A cubic hypersurface in P4 has at most 10 nodes, and up to isomorphism the Segre cubic is the unique one with 10 nodes. Its nodes are the points conjugate to (1:1:1:−1:−1:−1) under permutations of coordinates.

The Segre cubic is rational and furthermore birationally equivalent to a compactification of the Siegel modular variety A2(2).

References

3-folds